The Denmark–Germany border is  long and separates Denmark and Germany.

History
In the treaty of Heiligen year 811 the Eider was recognized as a border between Denmark and the Frankish Empire. As a swampy river, it formed a natural border. On the highest area near the watershed, it was dryer. The very old travel route Hærvejen went there, and a defense wall, Danevirke, was built there. Later the duchies of Schleswig and Holstein arose. Before 1864 Schleswig was a fiefdom of Denmark, while Holstein was a fief of the Holy Roman Empire (until 1806) and a member of the German Confederation (after 1815). Both territories were ruled by the Danish king in his additional role as Duke of Schleswig and Duke of Holstein (occasionally together with other Dukes, like the Gottorp Dukes). The border between the Danish fief of Schleswig and the German fief of Holstein still ran along the Eider, the boundary between the duchies and the Kingdom of Denmark ran along the Kongeåen and the southern boundary of the Danish monarchy (≈Helstaten) ran along the Elbe.

In 1864, Schleswig-Holstein was conquered by Prussia, and so an international border was created between Denmark and Germany/Schleswig-Holstein.

In 1920, the border was moved about  southwards to the present position, as determined by the Schleswig referendum in 1920. This approximately followed the not clearly defined language border.

Border controls
In 2001, all border controls were removed based on the Schengen Agreement.

In response to the Swedish border control due to the European migrant crisis, border checks were temporarily introduced starting January 4, 2016. Prime minister Lars Løkke Rasmussen cited fear of accumulation of illegal migrants in Copenhagen as one of the reasons for this decision. It was reported that the border controls at the German border cost the Danish tax payers 1.25 billion DKK (€167 million) from 2016 until mid-2019. They were never fully ended before the COVID-19 pandemic in early 2020, which caused renewed border closures throughout Europe.

Wild boar fence (Vildsvinehegn)
In January 2019, the Danish government began constructing a fence along the border to keep wild boar, which can carry African swine fever virus, from crossing into Denmark. The fence has created some protests. In May 2019 a volleyball tournament was held over the fence as a publicity event which was given some media attention. After completion there was a decision to raise it by adding wires over it, because animals like deer have been killed after being injured because of jumping over the fence.

Border crossings

See also
 Denmark–Germany relations

References

 
European Union internal borders
Germany
Borders of Germany
International borders
Holy Roman Empire